
Möðruvallabók or AM 132 fol is an Icelandic manuscript from the mid-14th century, inscribed on vellum. It contains the following Icelandic sagas in this order:

Njáls saga
Egils saga
Finnboga saga ramma
Bandamanna saga
Kormáks saga
Víga-Glúms saga
Droplaugarsona saga
Ölkofra þáttr
Hallfreðar saga
Laxdœla saga
Bolla þáttr Bollasonar
Fóstbrœðra saga

Many of those sagas are preserved in fragments elsewhere but are only found in their full length in Möðruvallabók, which contains the largest known single repertoire of Icelandic sagas of the Middle Ages. 

The manuscript takes its name from Möðruvellir , the farm in Eyjafjörður where it was found. In 1628, Magnús Björnsson signed his name in it with the location. It was brought to Denmark in 1684 by Thomas Bartholin and incorporated into the Arnamagnæan Collection in 1690. It was returned to Iceland in 1974 after the collection's division into an Icelandic and a Danish section.

See also
Árni Magnússon, who assembled the Arnamagnæan Manuscript Collection

References

External links
Images of manuscripts at the Árni Magnússon Institute site (Möðruvallabók is the second from the top in the list)
Best quality images at handrit.is
Text in Icelandic at the Árni Magnússon Institute site
Entry at Sagnanet
Árni Magnússon and the Collecting of Icelandic Manuscripts

Further reading
Bjarni Einarsson. "Um Möðruvallabók". Tíminn, 17 June 1965, p. 25 

14th-century books
Icelandic manuscripts
Sagas of Icelanders